Little River may refer to the following rivers in the U.S. state of South Carolina:

Little River (Broad River), a tributary of the Broad River
Little River (Horry County, South Carolina), flowing directly into the Atlantic Ocean
Little River Inlet, the southern mouth of the above river
Little River (McCormick County, South Carolina), a tributary of the Savannah River
Little River (Oconee County, South Carolina), a tributary of the Keowee River
Little River (Saluda River), a tributary of the Saluda River in Newberry and Laurens Counties

Rivers of South Carolina